Carl Jacob Löwig (17 March 1803 – 27 March 1890) was a German chemist and discovered bromine independently of Antoine Jérôme Balard.

He received his PhD at the University of Heidelberg for his work with Leopold Gmelin. 
During his research on mineral salts he discovered bromine in 1825, as a brown gas evolving after the salt was treated with chlorine.

After working at the University of Heidelberg and the University of Zurich he became the successor to Robert Wilhelm Bunsen at the University of Breslau. He worked and lived in Breslau until his death in 1890.

References

19th-century German chemists
Discoverers of chemical elements
1803 births

1890 deaths
People from Bad Kreuznach